Sheikh Ekrima Sa'id Sabri (born 1939) was the Grand Mufti of Jerusalem and Palestine from October 1994 to July 2006. He was appointed by Yasser Arafat.

Mahmoud Abbas removed Sabri as mufti in July 2006, reportedly for his growing popularity and open expression of racially charged, one sided political views. Mahmoud Abbas appointed Muhammad Ahmad Hussein in July 2006 as Sabri's successor.

Israel has arrested Sabri several times, latest in March 2021.

Controversy
In a 1999 interview regarding the political situation on the Temple Mount, Sabri stated, "If the Jews want peace, they will stay away from Al Aqsa. This is a decree from God. The Haram al-Sharif belongs to the Muslim. But we know the Jew is planning on destroying the Haram. The Jew will get the Christian to do his work for him. This is the way of the Jews. This is the way Satan manifests himself. The majority of the Jews want to destroy the mosque. They are preparing this as we speak."

In a 2000 interview with the Italian newspaper la Repubblica, Sabri responded to a question about the Holocaust by stating, "Six million Jews dead? No way, they were much fewer. Let’s stop with this fairy tale exploited by Israel to capture international solidarity. It is not my fault if Hitler hated Jews, indeed they were hated a little everywhere. Instead, it is necessary to denounce the unjust occupation endured by my people. Tomorrow I will ask John Paul II... to support our cause."

On 20 February 2005, Sabri appeared on Saudi Arabian Al Majd TV to comment on the assassination of Rafic Hariri, the former Lebanese Prime Minister.  Sabri stated, "Anyone who studies The Protocols of the Elders of Zion and specifically the Talmud will discover that one of the goals of these Protocols is to cause confusion in the world and to undermine security throughout the world."

See also

Grand Mufti of Jerusalem

Notes and references

Palestinian imams
An-Najah National University alumni
Grand Muftis of Jerusalem
Palestinian Sunni Muslims
20th-century imams
21st-century imams
Living people
1939 births
Palestinian Holocaust deniers
Al-Azhar University alumni